Woodleaf (formerly, Barker House, Barker Ranch, Barker's Ranch, and Woodville) is an unincorporated community in Yuba County, California.

A post office operated at Woodleaf from 1898 to 1971, with a closure from 1945 to 1947. Originally named after Charles Barker who settled here in 1850, the name now honors James Wood who bought the property in 1858.

Young Life operates a camp in Woodleaf.

References

Further reading

External links
Woodleaf Young Life Camp

Unincorporated communities in California
Populated places established in 1850
1850 establishments in California
Unincorporated communities in Yuba County, California